Daniel, Dan or Danny Harrison may refer to:

 Daniel Harrison (actor) in The Well, an Australian film
 Daniel Harrison (merchant) (1795–1873), English tea and coffee merchant
 Daniel Harrison (musicologist) (born 1959), music theorist, author and chairman of the Department of Music at Yale University
 Daniel Harrison (rugby league) (born 1988), Australian rugby league player
 Daniel Harrison House, also known as "Fort Harrison", a historic home located near Dayton, Rockingham County, Virginia
 Dan Harrison (actor) in Maciste in King Solomon's Mines
 Dan Harrison (filmmaker) of Older than America
 Dan Harrison (strongman) in All-American Strongman Challenge
 Danny Harrison (EastEnders), fictional character
 Danny Harrison (footballer) (born 1982), English footballer
 Danny Harrison (musician), Canadian singer-songwriter-guitarist who was active in the 1960s
 Danny Harrison, English house and garage producer and one half of the duos 187 Lockdown and Moto Blanco

See also
 Dhani Harrison (born 1978), musician, composer and singer-songwriter whose name is often pronounced "Danny Harrison", son of George Harrison